Divine Strake was the official designation for a large-yield, non-nuclear, high-explosive test that was planned for the Nevada National Security Site, formerly the Nevada Test Site. Following its announcement, the test generated great controversy, centering on two issues: its potential value in developing a nuclear "bunker buster" warhead, and the possibility that the mushroom cloud generated by the explosion could carry large amounts of radioactive dust deposited at the Test Site over years of nuclear testing.

On February 22, 2007 the Defense Threat Reduction Agency (DTRA) officially cancelled the experiment.

Background and controversy
The test was originally scheduled for June 2, 2006, at the site of an existing tunnel in the United States Department of Energy Nevada Test Site. It was first postponed until September 2006 as the result of a lawsuit filed on behalf of Native American and environmental groups concerned that the explosion could thrust into the atmosphere nuclear fallout from previous nuclear tests at the Test Site, and was later postponed even further to 2007.

In August 2006, a spokesperson for the Defense Threat Reduction Agency told the Las Vegas Review-Journal that a limestone quarry near Bedford, Indiana was under consideration as a possible alternative location for the test. Professor David Sanders, Democratic candidate for U.S. Representative for the 4th Congressional District of Indiana, organized efforts to oppose the test in Indiana.  Michael Evenson of the Defense Threat Reduction Agency stated that the site in Indiana was no longer being considered on August 29, 2006.  In mid-November, DTRA ended  speculation that the test would be moved to New Mexico when the agency informed Sen. Pete Domenici, R-N.M., that environmental studies needed to move the Divine Strake test to the New Mexico missile range would delay the test too long and that the test would be held in Nevada.

In December 2006, the revision to the Environmental Assessment was released, and public meetings to be held by the Pentagon were announced for January. Although the study concluded that there were no health risks to persons outside the blast area, it did state that:
Since suspended natural radionuclides and resuspended fallout radionuclides from the detonation have potential to be transported off of the NTS by wind, they may contribute radiological dose to the public.

The test would have utilized 700 tons of ANFO (ammonium nitrate + fuel oil) explosive, which is equivalent to 593 tons of TNT. The center of gravity of the charge would have been at least 20 feet below ground level.

Some media reports have stated that the purpose of Divine Strake was to test the ability of a conventional explosive to penetrate underground military compounds. However, other reports suggested that this explanation was not credible given the weight, dimensions and emplacement of the charge and that the program was designed to test the effects of a nuclear bunker buster on deeply buried tunnel structures. The organization immediately responsible for conducting the test, the Defense Threat Reduction Agency, stated:

The experiment is not being conducted in support of any specific existing or planned nuclear or conventional weapon. However, the data from DIVINE STRAKE and previous smaller explosive tests against the tunnel will be used to support improvement of computer modeling codes for predicting ground shock propagation and ground motion.

Effects
The test is reminiscent of The Gadget test of 1945, and was expected to produce a mushroom cloud; however, this test would have been far smaller than the Minor Scale simulated nuclear explosion at White Sands Missile Range in 1985. The test, which would not have been visible from Las Vegas, was expected to shoot a cloud of debris 10,000 feet in the air and result in a 3.1- to 3.4-magnitude earthquake. A leading environmental consultant, Richard L. Miller, believes that six tests conducted in the 1950s may have spread contamination over the area where the Pentagon planned to detonate the explosives. The question of radioactive contamination was raised by two Utah legislators, Senator Orrin Hatch and Representative Jim Matheson, who asked for detailed mapping of the contamination surrounding the Divine Strake site.

See also
Bunker buster
Downwinders

Notes

External links
DOE: Draft December 2006 Revised Environmental Assessment - Divine Strake
Salt Lake Tribune: Report concedes toxic dust may be dispersed but says there is no threat
PCH Press: U.S. Still Planning Divine Strake For Iran
PCH Press: U.S. Set To Develop Special Nuke Against Iran; Shoshone Win Small Victory
Washington Post: Pentagon to Test a Huge Conventional Bomb
Extract from Jane's Intelligence Digest article on 'Divine Strake'
Washington Post: Pentagon Clarifies Nevada Intent  April 7, 2006.
WPVI-ABC article on "Divine Strake"
"Divine Strake" on GlobalSecurity.org
US Indymedia: Stop The "Divine Strake" at the Nevada Test Site
Federation of American Scientists: Strategic Security Blog on Divine Strake
Las Vegas SUN: Test blast linked to nuke weapons
Government withdraws environmental finding, Divine Strake test delayed
Divine Strake blast delayed indefinitely
Divine Strake Could Be Rescheduled For September
Divine Strake session criticized
ABC 4 News - Stop Divine Strake– Editorial and links to video news reports

Nevada Test Site